A balancing machine is a measuring tool used for balancing rotating machine parts such as rotors for electric motors, fans, turbines, disc brakes, disc drives, propellers and pumps.  The machine usually consists of two rigid pedestals, with suspension and bearings on top supporting a  mounting platform. The unit under test is bolted to the platform and is rotated either with a belt-, air-, or end-drive.  As the part is rotated, the vibration in the suspension is detected with sensors and that information is used to determine the amount of unbalance in the part.  Along with phase information, the machine can determine how much and where to add or remove weights to balance the part.

Hard-bearing vs. soft-bearing 
There are two main types of balancing machines, hard-bearing and soft-bearing.  The difference between them, however, is in the suspension and not the bearings.

In a hard-bearing machine, balancing is done at a frequency lower than the resonance frequency of the suspension. Thus the suspension's resulting displacement is caused by the centrifugal force generated by the unbalance of the rotor. In a soft-bearing machine, balancing is done at a frequency higher than the resonance frequency of the suspension. The suspension's displacement is dictated by the distance of the rotor's principal axis of inertia relative to the rotor's rotational axis defined by the rotor bearings. Both types of machines have various advantages and disadvantages. A hard-bearing machine is generally more versatile and can handle pieces with greatly varying weights, because hard-bearing machines are measuring centrifugal forces and require only a one-time calibration. Only five geometric dimensions need to be fed into the measuring unit and the machine is ready for use. Therefore, it works very well for low- and middle-size volume production and in repair workshops.

A soft-bearing machine is not so versatile with respect to amount of rotor weight to be balanced. The preparation of a soft-bearing machine for individual rotor types is more time consuming, because it needs to be calibrated for different part types which makes the process accuracy dependent on the operator's knowledge and skill. With measuring equipment capable of storing the setup calibration parameters, the need for recalibration becomes unnecessary as long as the original rotor setup on the balancing machine at the time of its calibration is duplicated. Thus use of dedicated fixture for each type of rotor may come at additional cost but offers the advantage of better balancing process accuracy and less dependent on the machine operator's skill level. With the machine setup a little bit more tedious, it is generally more suitable for high-production volume and high-precision balancing tasks. The latter being required when the rotor has a high service speed, or critical application (see ISO 201940 for recommended balancing tolerance.)

Hard- and soft-bearing machines can be automated to remove weight automatically, such as by drilling or milling, but hard-bearing machines are more robust and reliable. Both machine principles can be integrated into a production line and loaded by a robot arm or gantry, requiring very little human control.

How it works 
With the rotating part resting on the bearings, a vibration sensor is attached to the suspension. In most soft-bearing machines, a velocity sensor is used. This sensor works by moving a magnet in relation to a fixed coil that generates voltage proportional to the velocity of the vibration. Accelerometers, which measure acceleration of the vibration, can also be used.

A photocell (sometimes called a phaser), proximity sensor, or encoder is used to determine the rotational speed, as well as the relative phase of the rotating part. This phase information is then used to filter the vibration information to determine the amount of movement, or force, in one rotation of the part. Also, the time difference between the phase and the vibration peak gives the angle at which the unbalance exists. Amount of unbalance and angle of unbalance give an unbalance vector.

Calibration is performed by adding a known weight at a known angle. In a soft-bearing machine, trial weights must be added in correction planes for each part. This is because the location of the correction planes along the rotational axis is unknown, and therefore it is unknown how much a given amount of weight will affect the balance. By using trial weights, a known weight at a known angle is added, and getting the unbalance vector caused by it.

Other balancing machine types 
Static balancing machines differ from hard- and soft-bearing machines in that the part is not rotated to take a measurement. Rather than resting on its bearings, the part rests vertically on its geometric center.  Once at rest, any movement by the part away from its geometric center is detected by two perpendicular sensors beneath the table and returned as unbalance.  Static balancers are often used to balance parts with a diameter much larger than their length, such as fans.  The advantages of using a static balancer are speed and price. However a static balancer can only correct in one plane, so its accuracy is limited.

A blade balancing machine attempts to balance a part in assembly, so minimal correction is required later on. Blade mass balancing is typically done for short blades, while long blades may require moment weighing in one or two axes. Long blades that are also wide may require its axial moment to be measured to optimize hub stress distribution. Blade balancers are used on parts such as fans, propellers, and turbines.  On a blade balancer, the weight and/or moment of each blade to be assembled is entered into a balancing software package.  The software then sorts the blades and attempts to find the blade arrangement with the least amount of unbalance. Lesser amount of unbalance correction weight in the final balancing process means lesser (concentrated) stress to the rotor assembly. 

Portable balancing machines are used to balance parts that cannot be taken apart and put on a balancing machine, usually parts that are currently in operation such as turbines, pumps, and motors.  Portable balancers come with displacement sensors, such as accelerometers, and a photocell, which are then mounted to the pedestals or enclosure of the running part. Based on the vibrations detected, they calculate the part's unbalance.  Many times these devices contain a spectrum analyzer so the part condition can be monitored without the use of a photocell and non-rotational vibration can be analyzed.

See also 
 Carl Schenck, German businessman 
 Gordon E. Hines, inventor of hard-bearing balancing machines and other balancing technologies
 Rotordynamics, applied mechanics of rotating structures
 Tire balance

References

Further reading 

 Adolf Lingener: Auswuchten. Theorie und Praxis. Verlag Technik, Berlin und München 1992, 
 Hatto Schneider: Auswuchttechnik. 6. Auflage. Springer, Berlin u. a. 2003, 
 .

External links

 Basic frequently answered questions about balancing machines

Measuring instruments